Masvingo Airport  is an airport serving Masvingo, the capital of Masvingo Province in Zimbabwe. It is mainly used for small chartered aircraft or by military aircraft.

The Masvingo VOR-DME (Ident: VMV) is located on the field.

See also
Transport in Zimbabwe
List of airports in Zimbabwe

References

External links
 
OurAirports - Masvingo
OpenStreetMap - Masvingo
Masvingo Airport

Airports in Zimbabwe
Buildings and structures in Masvingo Province